Helen E.E. (Brown) Rankin (November 23, 1931 – August 12, 2022) was an American politician from Maine. A Democrat, Rankin served in the Maine House of Representatives from 2008 until 2014. Rankin represented District 97, which included the Oxford County towns of Brownfield, Fryeburg, Hiram, Parsonsfield and Porter. Rankin died on August 12, 2022, at the age of 90.

References

1931 births
2022 deaths
21st-century American women
Maine Democrats
People from Hiram, Maine
Women state legislators in Maine